King's College London Business Ltd (formerly KCL Enterprises Ltd) is an English technology transfer company.  A wholly owned subsidiary of King's College London, King's Business "supports and commercialises the research of King’s academic staff".

References

King's College London
Technology transfer